Marco Barbaro (1511 – 1570) was a member of the Venetian noble Barbaro family, and the author of Genealogie Patrizie and other works in Venetian.

References

1511 births
1570 deaths
Italian genealogists
Marco
16th-century Venetian historians
16th-century male writers